Trupanea inaequabilis is a species of tephritid or fruit flies in the genus Pliomelaena of the family Tephritidae.

Distribution
India.

References

Tephritinae
Insects described in 1942
[[Category:Diptera of Asia}]]